G. Leon Netterville (July 16, 1906 - February 12, 2000) was an African-American academic administrator. He served as the president of Southern University, a historically black university and land grant college in Baton Rouge, Louisiana, from 1968 to 1972.

Early life
Netterville was born on July 16, 1906, in Ascension Parish, Louisiana. He graduated from Southern University, where he earned a bachelor's degree. He subsequently earned a master's degree from Columbia University.

Career
Netterville returned to his alma mater, Southern University, as the dean of men and business manager in 1938. He was vice president for finance and business affairs in 1967, and he served as president from 1968 to 1972. In November 1972, he fired two faculty members who had advised Civil Rights activists during protests. He retired shortly after two students were shot on campus.

Personal life and death
With his wife Rebecca, Netterville had a son, George Leon Netterville III. Both predeceased him. Netterville resided in Baton Rouge.  He is survived by his granddaughter Rebecca Netterville.

Netterville died on February 12, 2000, in Baton Rouge, at 93.

References

1906 births
2000 deaths
People from Ascension Parish, Louisiana
People from New Orleans
Southern University alumni
Columbia University alumni
Southern University presidents
20th-century American academics